Wattinoma is a village in the Guibare Department of Bam Province in northern Burkina Faso. It has a population of 686.

References

Populated places in the Centre-Nord Region
Bam Province